The Maruti Suzuki Alto is a city car manufactured and marketed by Suzuki through its subsidiary Maruti Suzuki primarily for the Indian market since 2000. The first-generation model was essentially the Indian version of the fifth-generation Suzuki Alto kei car (with larger engine options). The second generation was made as a standalone model, which was built on the same platform as the first generation. The third-generation model is built on the same underpinnings as the S-Presso.

Since 2006, the Alto has been India's best-selling car and crossed the 1 million production figure in February 2008 becoming the third Maruti model to cross the million mark in India after Maruti 800 and Maruti Omni and fourth overall joining Hyundai Santro.



First generation (RF; 2000) 

The first generation was launched to the local Indian market on 27 September 2000 although the Alto nameplate had been successfully used to export the Maruti Suzuki Zen to Europe from India since around 1994, having captured over 40% market share in Belgium and 33% in Netherlands by 1998. The original Alto 800 carries the RF308 chassis code while the three-cylinder K10 is RF310; the four-cylinder export version is RF410.

The Alto was seen as a natural successor to the time-tested and equally popular Maruti 800 (MB 308). It contained all the plus points that the 800 offered Indian car-buyers, in addition to features such as power-steering, power-assisted braking and a 5th gear that the 800 did not normally have. The popularity of the Alto has steadily increased over the past few years, mainly due to the aggressive pricing. This reduction in prices has mainly come in due to the reduction in excise duty over time. Alto became the first car in India to sell over 200,000 units in a single financial year, the last 100,000 units being sold in 5 months. Alto was also the only car to sell over 22,000 units in a single month. Maruti's vast network of dealerships and Maruti Authorized Service Centers (MASS) have also contributed towards this massive popularity in the Indian entry-level automobile market.

Alto K10 (RF310) 
Maruti Suzuki India launched a new version of the first generation Alto in the Indian auto market in August 2010, the Alto K10. The new Maruti Alto K10 is equipped with the company's 1.0-litre, K-series DOHC inline-three petrol engine which also powered the Celerio and Wagon R, mated to a five-speed manual transmission. The K10 has a redesigned front end, with more sculpted headlights. This spelled the end for the F10-engined model, while the F8-engined Alto was replaced by the all-new Alto 800 in late 2012. The Alto K10 remained in production until 2014.

Europe 
This model, using the fuel injected 1061 cc F10D engine, entered the European market at the March 2002 Geneva Motor Show. Being built in India by Maruti, it was only available with five doors, unlike earlier Maruti Zen-based Altos in Europe. Unlike in India, European model Alto was available with a 3-speed automatic transmission option. The car was discontinued in 2006.

Specifications 
Until the late 2010 introduction of the K10 Alto, it was powered by a three-cylinder  gasoline engine with four valves per cylinder, MPFI and a 32-bit ECM. All models have a five-speed manual transmission. This has now been discontinued, although it was sold for longer in certain European countries. The VX model also featured a tachometer not found in lesser Altos.

Alto 800 (RF308):

 Maximum Power:  at 6200 rpm
 Torque:  at 3000 rpm
 Acceleration 0–100 km/h: approximately 20 seconds
 Top Speed: 

Alto 1.1 (RF410):

 Maximum Power:  at 6000 rpm
 Torque:  at 3200 rpm
 Acceleration 0–100 km/h: approximately 15 seconds
 Top Speed: 

Alto K10 (RF310):

 Maximum Power:  at 6200 rpm
 Torque:  at 3200 rpm
 Acceleration 0–100 km/h: approximately 13 seconds
 Top Speed: approximately

Safety 

The Indian-made K10 version in its most basic Latin American configuration with no airbags was crash tested by Latin NCAP in 2013. It received 0 stars for the adult occupant and 3 stars for child occupant. The car is not equipped with airbags, front seatbelts with pretensioner, ISOFIX or ABS.

Gallery

Second generation (AOD; 2012) 

A new version of the Alto called the Alto 800 was released in the Indian car market on 16 October 2012. The Alto 800, model code AOD308, is still based on the previous generation's platform (which is still based on the 1998 Alto kei car) has all-new bodywork and interior. It replaced the first generation Maruti Alto (although the predecessor continued to be produced for a little longer), and while keeping the  engine, there have been several modifications. The price of the Alto, already India's best-selling car, was actually lowered with the model change. Various methods were found to lower the price, including the lowering of the weight of each individual component by one gram each, and also by building their own robots for manufacturing the car. This is also sold as the Suzuki Alto 800 in many export markets. In May 2016, refurbished version of Alto 800 has been introduced with notable changes to the exteriors, interiors, features and specifications. The new Maruti Alto 800 comes with an improved fuel efficiency. It is now capable of returning a mileage of 24.7 km/L. In April 2019, the car received another improvement.

Alto K10 
Maruti Suzuki then launched a K10-powered version of the second generation Alto (AOD310) on 3 November 2014. Introduced at a base price of Rs. 3.06 Lakh, the next gen Alto K10 comes with multiple exterior and interiors updates, however mechanically it remains same. The car is a somewhat upgraded version of the Alto 800 with a new front fascia comprising a new chrome fitted front grille, new swept back headlamps, and a redesigned bonnet line. There are also amendments for tail lights, restructuring of bumpers, 13-inch wheels, door mirrors, door moulding and some other minor modifications. Interiors too have been updated, with a new dashboard, three-spoke steering wheel, refined upholstery, black finished music system and a better looking instrument cluster. Other added features inside the car include front power windows, 12 V power socket, internally adjustable door mirrors, headlamp warning buzzer, key off reminder and gearshift indicator.

Powering the 2015 Alto K10 is the same 1.0-litre K10B engine that also powers the Celerio and Wagon R. However, this time it has been tuned to provide better fuel economy, and the new Alto K10 returns an ARAI-certified fuel economy of 24.06 km/L, 15 percent better than the outgoing model. The Alto K10 facelift is available with two different transmission; 5-speed manual and 5-speed Auto Gear Shift (AGS) transmission. The AGS is an automated manual transmission technology, which shifts gear with the help of an ECU mapped actuator on pre-defined engine speeds. It also allows driver to shift gears when required.

The Alto K10 was discontinued in 2020, being temporarily replaced by the S-Presso. The 800 cc variant remains in production.

Safety 
In 2014, an Alto 800 with no airbags and no ABS was crash tested by Global NCAP (similar to Latin NCAP 2013). The car received 0 stars for adult occupant and 2 stars for child occupant.

Gallery

Third generation (2022) 

The third-generation Alto K10 was launched in India on 18 August 2022. It is built on the HEARTECT platform shared with the S-Presso.

References 

Cars introduced in 2000
2010s cars
2020s cars
City cars
Front-wheel-drive vehicles
Hatchbacks
Alto
Global NCAP superminis
Latin NCAP superminis